Balekundri (B.K.) is a village in Belgaum district in the southern state of Karnataka, India.

Notable people
 Pant Maharaj, Hindu yogi who lived in the village with a temple dedicated to him in the village.

References

Villages in Belagavi district